The 1952–53 Romanian Hockey League season was the 23rd season of the Romanian Hockey League. Six teams participated in the league, and CCA Bucuresti won the championship.

Regular season

External links
hochei.net

Romania
Romanian Hockey League seasons
1952–53 in Romanian ice hockey